Pori Rugby is a Finnish rugby club in Pori. The men's team is known as the Bombers and a women's team called the Lollers.

External links
Pori Rugby

Finnish rugby union teams
Sport in Pori
Sport in Satakunta